T29  may refer to:
 Convair T-29 Flying Classroom, an American trainer aircraft
 Fuminosato Station, in Abeno-ku, Osaka, Japan 
 
 , a minesweeper of the Royal Navy
 Junkers T 29, a German experimental trainer aircraft
 T29 Heavy Tank, an American heavy tank project